Heaven and Earth is a posthumous studio album by John Martyn, completed by Gary Pollitt, released online on 16 May 2011. During recording the album was provisionally entitled Willing to Work.

Track listing
All tracks composed by John Martyn except "Can't Turn Back The Years", a Phil Collins composition that originally appeared on his album Both Sides.
"Heel of the Hunt"
"Stand Amazed"
"Heaven and Earth"
"Bad Company"
"Could've Told You Before I Met You"
"Gambler"
"Can't Turn Back The Years" (Phil Collins)
"Colour"
"Willing to Work"

Personnel
 John Martyn - guitar, vocals
 Frank Usher, Garry Pollitt, Jim Weider - electric guitar
 Jim Tullio - guitar, atmospheric guitar, synthesizers
 John Giblin - acoustic bass, double bass
 Alan Thomson - bass
 Chris Cameron - Hammond organ, Wurlitzer organ, Fender Rhodes electric piano, clavinet, synthesizers
 Stefon Taylor - organ, synthesizers
 Spencer Cozens - synthesizers, piano, steel drums
 Garth Hudson - accordion
 Phil Collins - backing vocals (1 & 7), synthesizers
 Martin Winning - saxophone, bass clarinet
 Gary "Spacey" Foote - baritone saxophone
 Nathan Bray - trumpet
 Cheryl Wilson, Rene Robinson, Stevie Robinson - backing vocals
 Arran Ahmun - drums, percussion
 Suzi Chunk - percussion

External links
John Martyn's Website
Andy Gill (The Independent) Review
Nick Coleman (The Independent) Review
 Personnel list : https://www.discogs.com/John-Martyn-Heaven-And-Earth/release/4888573

2011 albums
John Martyn albums
Albums published posthumously